Ahmed Badrakhan (18 September 1909 – 26 August 1969) was an Egyptian film director and screenwriter of Kurdish origin. He directed 41 films between 1936 and 1968. He is famous for his 1952 romantic drama A Night of Love starring Mahmoud Almeleji and Mariam Fakhr Eddine. He directed Intisar al-chabab (1941) which for the first time starred the virtuoso oud player and singer Farid al-Atrash along with singer Asmahan. He was married to Asmahan, and would be a central figure in Misr studios, Egypts most popular cinema studio at the time.

Selected filmography
 Wedad (1936)
  (1941)
  (1947)
  (1950)
 A Night of Love (1951)
  (1954)
  (1955)
  (1955)
  (1956)

References

External links

1909 births
1969 deaths
Egyptian film directors
Egyptian screenwriters
20th-century screenwriters